is a railway station in Suruga-ku, Shizuoka City, Shizuoka Prefecture, Japan, operated by Central Japan Railway Company (JR Tōkai).

Lines
Abekawa Station is served by the Tōkaidō Main Line, and is located 184.5 kilometers from the starting point of the line at Tokyo Station.

Station layout
The station has  two side platforms serving Track 1 and Track 2, with the station building connecting the platforms. The station building has automated ticket machines, TOICA automated turnstiles and a staffed ticket office.

Platforms

Adjacent stations

|-
!colspan=5|Central Japan Railway Company

History
Abekawa Station was opened on March 14, 1985, primarily as a commuter station serving Shizuoka city.

Station numbering was introduced to the section of the Tōkaidō Line operated JR Central in March 2018; Abekawa Station was assigned station number CA18.

Passenger statistics
In fiscal 2017, the station was used by an average of 4,784 passengers daily (boarding passengers only).

Surrounding area
Nagata Minami Junior High School
Site of the Battle of Tegoshigawara

See also
 List of Railway Stations in Japan

References

Yoshikawa, Fumio. Tokaido-sen 130-nen no ayumi. Grand-Prix Publishing (2002) .

External links

Official home page

Railway stations in Japan opened in 1985
Tōkaidō Main Line
Stations of Central Japan Railway Company
Railway stations in Shizuoka (city)